Deportivo La Coruña's 1996–97 season included its 32nd appearance in La Liga, where it ranked third place. Welsh manager John Benjamin Toshack was replaced after 23 rounds by Brazilian head coach Carlos Alberto Silva.

Summary
Because of Rivaldo's great performance for the year, Deportivo placed third overall in La Liga finishing only below Champions Real Madrid and runners-up FC Barcelona. Former Deportivo President Augusto César Lendoiro reached an agreement with Palmeiras for $7 million to acquire Rivaldo before the 1996 Olympic Games, instead of buying midfielder Amaral. On 10 February 1997 after the team was eliminated in Copa del Rey quarterfinals, Lendoiro fired John Benjamin Toshack due to his interactions with club officials, players, and fans. The Welsh manager was replaced by the Palmeiras coach Carlos Alberto Silva. On 9 September 1996, Deportivo received Brazilian midfielder Flávio Conceição via transfer from Palmeiras.

Squad
Source: BdFútbol

Transfers

Competitions

La Liga

League table

Positions by round

Matches

Statistics

Players Statistics

References

Deportivo de La Coruña
Deportivo de La Coruña seasons